Festuca jubata is a species of grass in the family Poaceae. It is native to Azores and Madeira. It is a perennial and mainly grows in temperate biomes. It was first published in 1838.

References

jubata
Plants described in 1840